For Stability! (S!) is a eurosceptic Latvian political party founded on 26 February 2021. It was founded by former members of the Riga City Council Aleksejs Roslikovs and Valērijs Petrovs. It is a party that advocates Russian minority politics, and it describes itself as centrist on the political spectrum.

The party organized multiple protests in 2021 against mandatory vaccination and restrictions related to the COVID-19 pandemic

History 
The For Stability - Yes! group was founded in the winter of 2021. It was founded by two former Riga councilors elected from the list of the Social Democratic Party "Harmony": Aleksejs Rosļikovs and Valērijs Petrovs. In the early 2020 Riga City Council election, both councilors stood on the list of the Alternative party, which did not win seats in the council.  At the end of the ten days set aside for collecting signatures, a total of 315 people participated in the founding of the party. At the time of its founding, the party had 647 members. The party's establishment was voted unanimously, and the party was officially founded on 26 February 2021.

The group's leaders emphasized that they would build a political party free of sponsors, which would contribute to the stabilization of the state as its main task. They also announced that they would run in the local elections in 2021. They chose Law and Order and the Republic as the closest groups.

The party ran in the 2022 Latvian parliamentary election. It named Aleksejs Roslikovs as the candidate for prime minister. Among others, in favor of leaving the European Union, achieving economic sovereignty and energy independence, direct presidential elections, reducing the number of deputies and majority voting. The party's postulates also included a revision of the tax policy, including a reduction in VAT on food and medicines. As regards schools, the party spoke out in favor of the right to education in Russian. The leader of the electoral list, Rosļikovs, described the party as centrist, while experts point to its populist profile.

Party program

Political program 
 The President is to be directly elected
 Reform the European Union (EU) to give priority to national interests, or if not, leave the EU
 Reduce tax rate on food, abolish tax on medicines
 Electoral reform to allow the opportunity for people to vote for independent/nonpartisan candidates.
 Reduction of the number of deputies in the Saeima from 100 to 50.
 Reduce the number of government ministries from 13 to 11 by combining the Ministry of the Economy with the Ministry of Finance, and the Ministry of Culture with the Ministry of Education.
 Prohibit MPs from voting "abstain"
 Opposition to vaccine mandates and lockdowns
 Allow non-citizens to vote in municipal elections.

Election results

Legislative elections

References

External links 

 Website 
 Facebook page
Political parties in Latvia
Political parties established in 2021
2021 establishments in Latvia